Paweł Krupa (born 24 October 1989) is a Polish handball player for Pogoń Szczecin and the Polish national team.

References

1989 births
Living people
Polish male handball players